Raul Kivilo (born 4 October 1973) is an Estonian archer. He competed at the 1992 Summer Olympics and the 1996 Summer Olympics.

References

1973 births
Living people
Estonian male archers
Olympic archers of Estonia
Archers at the 1992 Summer Olympics
Archers at the 1996 Summer Olympics
People from Rapla
20th-century Estonian people